Delirium tremens usually refers to an alcohol withdrawal process (also known as The DT's).

Delirium tremens can also refer to:
 Delirium Tremens, a beer by the Huyghe Brewery 
 Delerium Tremens, the original name of Omega, California, now a ghost town in Nevada County
Delirium Tremens (Sulfur album), 1998
Delirium Tremens (Mick Harvey album), 2016
Delirium Tremens, an album by X-Alfonso
"Delirum Tremens", a song by Christy Moore
Delirium Tremens, a Basque punk rock band